Alan Robertson is a former swimming representative from New Zealand.

At the 1962 British Empire and Commonwealth Games he won the bronze medal in the men's 220 yards backstroke. He placed 5th in the 100 yards backstroke.

See also
 List of Commonwealth Games medallists in swimming (men)

References

Commonwealth Games bronze medallists for New Zealand
New Zealand male backstroke swimmers
Swimmers at the 1962 British Empire and Commonwealth Games
Living people
Commonwealth Games medallists in swimming
Year of birth missing (living people)
Medallists at the 1962 British Empire and Commonwealth Games